Henri Lemoine (18 June 1909 – 21 September 1991) was a French cyclist. He competed at the 1928 Summer Olympics in the 2000 m tandem sprint and finished in fifth place. He then turned professional and competed up to 1958 in road racing and motor-paced racing. In the latter discipline he won six national titles, in 1938, 1942, 1945, and 1951–53, as well as three bronze medals at the UCI Motor-paced World Championships in 1951–1953. On 23 July 1931 he set a world record in one kilometre from standing start at the Buffalo Stadium (1'10.80).

In road races, he finished second in the Critérium des As in 1930 and 1931, 11th in the 1932 Critérium Internationale, and 20th in the 1933 Grand Prix des Nations.

References

1909 births
1991 deaths
French male cyclists
Olympic cyclists of France
Cyclists at the 1928 Summer Olympics
People from Massy, Essonne
Sportspeople from Essonne
Cyclists from Île-de-France
20th-century French people